Con O'Callaghan (born April 1996) is an Irish sportsperson. He plays Gaelic football for the Dublin county football team.

He is a dual player for the Cuala club, in football senior "A" and hurling senior "A". He was also a dual player at inter-county minor level.

O'Callaghan is a capable free-taker; however, with Dublin he is not required to take them, with Dean Rock and Cormac Costello on the field.

Playing career

Club
O'Callaghan plays hurling for the Cuala club.

College
O'Callaghan played for UCD and won the 2018 Sigerson Cup.

Inter-county
O'Callaghan made his football championship debut for Dublin against Laois in the quarter-final of the 2016 All-Ireland Senior Football Championship. He scored a single point against Laois as Dublin progressed to the Leinster semi-final. He made his second appearance against in Dublin's semi final victory over Meath and continued this trend in the final against Westmeath. He failed to make an appearance outside the Leinster Championship but won a medal as a squad member of the 2016 All-Ireland Champions Dublin.

2017 started with O'Callaghans first start as a senior inter-county footballer with Dublin. He started the game against Carlow in the quarter final of the Leinster Championship. He scored two points from frees and failed to score from play in the victory over a very defensive Carlow side. In the Leinster semi final against Westmeath, he scored his first points of the 2017 campaign from play. He scored a total of three points from play in Dublin's victory over Westmeath in the semi-final. In July 2017, he won his second Leinster senior football championship with Dublin what proved to be his most prolific game from a scoring point of view. He scored a total of 0–12 points against Kildare at Croke Park and helped guide Dublin to their seventh consecutive Leinster Championship title. He took six frees during the game and scored six points.

O'Callaghan won the All-Ireland Under 21 Football Championship with Dublin in 2017, scoring a total of 1–3 against Galway at O'Connor Park. O'Callaghan scored his first senior goal for Dublin in their 2017 All-Ireland Senior Football Championship semi-final win over Tyrone. In the 2017 All-Ireland Final, O'Callaghan scored a goal for Dublin after 90 seconds of play as they went on to win their third All-Ireland title in a row.

In November 2017, O'Callaghan won his first football All-Star award and was also named as the All Stars Young Footballer of the Year.

He provided the assist for Niall Scully's goal in the 2018 All-Ireland Senior Football Championship Final.

By 2019, his physical development had reached remarkable proportions. Never physically light to begin with, he sported a shaven head to add to his tougher image. According to Alan Brogan, O'Callaghan had built a gym at the back of his house. In the 11th minute of a game against Roscommon, O'Callaghan collected a pass by Brian Fenton from above his head past the "D" and fell onto his twisted right leg. His former Dublin under-21 manager Dessie Farrell later remarked on the fall: "It was a model for a cruciate [injury], wasn't it?... I thought he was hurt the way he landed there for sure, but it's just a mark of his athleticism". O'Callaghan rose from the awkward fall without effort, immediately hopped the ball and sent it over the bar for a point. In the All-Ireland semi-final, he scored two goals past Lee Keegan and took a fierce hit from Mayo goalkeeper Rob Hennelly but was unaffected.

Career statistics

Honours

UCD
Sigerson Cup: 2018

Cuala
All-Ireland Senior Club Hurling Championship: 2016-17, 2017-18
Leinster Senior Club Hurling Championship: 2016-17, 2017-18
Dublin Senior Hurling Championship: 2016, 2017, 2019, 2020
 Dublin Senior B Football Championship: 2020

Dublin
All-Ireland Senior Football Championship: 2016, 2017, 2018, 2019,  2020
Leinster Senior Football Championship: 2016, 2017, 2018, 2019, 2020, 2021
National Football League: 2016, 2018, 2021
All-Ireland Under-21 Football Championship: 2017
Leinster Under-21 Football Championship: 2016, 2017
Leinster Minor Football Championship: 2014

Awards
All Stars Young Footballer of the Year: 2017
Sunday Game Team of the Year: 2017, 2019, 2020
GAA GPA All Stars Awards: 2017, 2019, 2020
All-Ireland SFC Final Man of the Match: 2020

References

1996 births
Living people
Cuala Gaelic footballers
Cuala hurlers
Dual players
Dublin inter-county Gaelic footballers
Gaelic football forwards
Sportspeople from Dublin (city)
UCD Gaelic footballers
Winners of five All-Ireland medals (Gaelic football)